Huayra GNU/Linux is a Linux distribution developed by the Argentine government. Originally developed by the ANSES for the Conectar Igualdad Program, currently it's maintained by the State Company Educ.ar. It's based on the Debian architecture. Having been released in the GNU GPL license, Huayra is free software.

Software developed by the Huayra team 
The Huayra team develops educational applications designed for students and teachers. There are also other applications that, while not educational, are designed for young kids.

Theme 

"The Huayra desktop presents a unique design. Every version of Huayra comes with a unique theme, the latest being "Liso", which includes a GRUB theme, Plymouth, icon pack, GTK2 and GTK3 application themes, window theme, MDM login manager, wallpapers and screensavers, which improve the user experience with Docky and Synapse".

There are various themes like Verde, Mayo or Limbo.

Versions 
This table shows all of the different versions of Huayra.

See also 
 Free Software Foundation
 Linux
 Debian GNU/Linux
 Canaima GNU/Linux

External links 
 

Debian-based distributions
Linux distributions